Dr. Akshaykumar Malharrao Kale born 27 July 1953, is a critic of modern Marathi poetry, and was Professor and Head of Marathi Department in RTM Nagpur University, Nagpur, India.
In the field of criticism of modern Marathi poetry, his contributions have attracted the attention of scholars of Marathi language and literature throughout Maharashtra. He was the president of prestigious 90th Akhil Bharatiya Marathi Sahitya Sammelan held in Dombivali. Kale is also member of general Council of Sahitya Akademi, India.

Early life and career
Kale was born on 27 July 1953 in the Kale family of Warud. He studied in Mahatma Fule College, Warud. He stood first in the MA Examination in 1974 and for PhD research he was awarded a Junior Research Fellowship of UGC, New Delhi in 1975. In 1980 at the age of 27 he was awarded doctorate (PhD) for his dissertation on "Trends in Post Independence Marathi Poetry 1947 to 1970" In 1980, he started his professional career with Dharampeth Arts and Commerece College, Nagpur. He secured his D.Litt. degree for his dissertation on "Arvacheen Marathi Kavyadarshan" in 1999, which has been commercially published.

Literature
Kale has been involved in research activities and has regularly published research articles in journals such as Pratishthan, Maharashtra Sahitya Patrika and Yugawani He has written over 100 articles published in various state and national magazines and newspapers, and many books.

 'Suktasandharbha' ( Marathi : सुक्तसंधर्भ ) (1985),
 'Govindagraj Samiksha' ( Marathi : गोविंदाग्रज समीक्षा ) (1985),
 'Kavita Kusumagrajanchi' ( Marathi : कविता कुसुमाग्रजांची ) (1987),
 ‘Arvacheen Marathi Karyadarshan’ ( Marathi : अर्वाचीन मराठी काव्यदर्शन ) (1999),
 'Mardhekaranchi Kavita : Aakalan Aswad aani Chikitsa' ( Marathi : मर्ढेकरांची कविता : आकलन आस्वाद आणि चिकित्सा  ) (2006),
 'Rashtrasanta Tukdoji Maharaj – Vyakti Ani Wangmay' (Marathi : राष्ट्रसंत तुकडोजी महाराज – व्यक्ती आणि वांग्मय) (2008),
 'Grace Vishayi' (Marathi :ग्रेस विषयी) (2009).
 'Sampradayik Sadhbhav ani samajik shantata' (Marathi :सांप्रदायिक सद्भाव आणि सामाजिक शांतता ) (2011)
 'Pratitivibhram' (Marathi : प्रतीतिविभ्रम) (2013)
 ' Ghalibche Urdu Kavyavishwa (Marathi : गालिबचे उर्दू काव्याविश्व : अर्थ आणि भाष्य ) (2014)

Apart from the above books written by him, below media is published on Dr.Kale
 'Arvacheen marathi kavyamimansa (Marathi : अर्वाचीन मराठी काव्यमिमांसा - डॉ. अक्षयकुमार काळे गौरवग्रंथ) (2014) - edited by various authors is commercially published.
 'Dr. Akshaykumar Kale Hyancha kavyasamikshecha chikitsak abhyas) (Marathi : डॉ. अक्षयकुमार काळे ह्यांचा काव्यसमीक्षेचा चिकित्सक अभ्यास), written by Dr.Ganesh Malte  The Thesis has been awarded Ph.D. in 2012.
 Documentary Film created on Dr.Kale in 2013

Awards, honours and recognition 

Kale has been conferred various awards. Below is the list of awards and issuing authority:

 Narahar Kurundakar Puraskar – Government of Maharashtra, 2000
 Best State Teacher Award – Government of Maharashtra
 Na.Chi. Kulkarni Award - Government of Maharashtra, 2022
 Kusumanil Smruti Samiksha Puraskar – Vidharbha Sahitya Sanga
 R.S. Jog Paritoshik – Maharashtra Sahitya Parishad, 2000
 D.D. Punde Samikshamitra Puraskar – Sneha Vardhan Prakashan, 2000
 Maharashtra Saraswat Puraskar – Rasik Rachana. Sanskrutik Ani Shaikshanik Mandal Wani, 2007
 Dr. V.B Kolte Janmashatabdi Vishesh Puraskar – Lokseva And Vikas Sansta, Chandrapur, 2008
 Award from maharashtra Granthottejak Sabha, Pune, 2006
 Best Teacher award of Acharya Atre Smrutee Prateishthan, Pune
 M.B.Chitnis Puraskar from Marathwada Sahitya Parishad, 2016
 Padmashri N.D.Mahanor Rajya Sahitya Puraskar, by Sahani Trust & Urmi Sanstha, 2016
 Sharatchandra Manohar Bhalerao Paritoshik for - Ghalib : Kaal, Charitra aani Vyaktimatva. From Maharashtra Sahitya Parishad Pune, May 2022
 Setu Madhavrao Pagdi Puraskar, Sahitya Akademi

Dr Kale has also held below positions apart from his professional role
 President of the 4th Jansahitya Sammelan, Sakoli organised by Vidarbha Sahitya Sangha in 2002.
 President of R.T.M. Nagpur University Marathi Pradhyapak Parishad, Bhandra, 14th Session 2003
 President of Sant Gadgebaba Amravati University Marathi Pradhyapak Parishad, Yavatmal, 17th Session in 2003.
 President of 64th Vidarbha Sahitya Sammelan 2014.
 Member, General council - Sahitya Akademi,  General council, Sahitya Akademi, and he is one of the 20 representatives of universities across India, since 2013
  President of 90th Akhil Bharatiya Marathi Sahitya Sammelan, Dombivli 2017

Personal life
Kale was born to Malharrao Kale (1919–2010) and Rajani Kale. He resides in Nagpur along with his wife Dr. Kalpana Kale. He has two sons, Amit and Salil.

References

External links
 Who's Who of Indian Writers – https://books.google.com/books?id=QA1V7sICaIwC&pg=PA548&dq=akshaykumar+kale+nagpur&hl=en#v=onepage&q=akshaykumar%20kale%20&f=false
 Ph.D. Registrations, Nagpur University – http://www.nagpuruniversity.org/links/Ph.D.ENTRANCE_TEST/pdf/Approved%20Topic%20with%20Student%20Name%20&%20Registration%20Date/Faculty%20of%20Arts%202000%20to/Marathi.pdf
 Dr. Kale on Poet Wakudkar (Loksatta) – https://archive.today/20121128205756/http://72.78.249.107/esakal/20111115/5432885183878973090.htm
 Dr. Kale on Waman Nimbalkar (Lokmat) – 
 Book Ganga Books – http://www.bookganga.com/eBooks/Books?AID=5112370922168198060
 MNS Official Website – https://web.archive.org/web/20120407183128/http://www.manase.org/en/maharashtra.php?mid=68&smid=21&id=488
 Maharashtra Govt Official Website – http://www.maharashtra.gov.in/pdf/gazeetter_reprint/Amravati/population_leading.html#.
 Quoted on TOI – http://articles.timesofindia.indiatimes.com/2011-12-22/pune/30546550_1_sahitya-akademi-award-national-award-manik-godghate 
 Yashwantrao Chauvhan Pratishthan – http://www.ybchavanpratishthan.org/Vibhagiy%20Kendra/Nagpur_Vibhagiy_Kendra.htm
 Board of Studies – https://web.archive.org/web/20111223124730/http://sgbau.ac.in/BOS-in-Arts-faculty.pdf
 Dr. Kale on Galib (Loksatta) – http://www.loksatta.com/index.php?option=com_content&view=article&id=180002:2011-09-02-19-49-16&catid=45:2009-07-15-04-01-33&Itemid=56
 TOI February 2008 – http://articles.timesofindia.indiatimes.com/2008-02-08/nagpur/27757603_1_distance-education-council-naxal-affected-areas-courses 
 Nagpur University Official Website – http://www.nagpuruniversity.org/links/department_of_marathi.htm
 ESakal (Kolte Puraskar) – http://article.wn.com/view/WNATbf97c402d9fa6e68e6f094f6b7d5c874/
 Rasik Sahitya Books – https://web.archive.org/web/20160304041653/http://erasik.com/books/by/Kale%20Akshayakumar/page1/
 Granthalaya.Org – http://granthalaya.org/cgi-bin/koha/opac-search.pl?q=au:%E0%A4%95%E0%A4%BE%E0%A4%B3%E0%A5%87%20%E0%A4%85%E0%A4%95%E0%A5%8D%E0%A4%B7%E0%A4%AF%E0%A4%95%E0%A5%81%E0%A4%AE%E0%A4%BE%E0%A4%B0
 Tarun Bharat – https://archive.today/20130223024700/http://tarunbharat.net/ftp/e-paper/2011-12-04/cpage15_20111204.htm
 E Rasik on Arvacheen Marathi Kavyadarshan – http://www.rasik.com/cgi_bin/display_book.cgi?bookId=b96414&lang=marathi
 Vidarbha sahitya Sammelan (Lokmat) – http://marathi.yahoo.com/%E0%A4%B5%E0%A4%BF%E0%A4%A6%E0%A4%B0%E0%A5%8D%E0%A4%AD-%E0%A4%B8%E0%A4%BE%E0%A4%B9%E0%A4%BF%E0%A4%A4%E0%A5%8D%E0%A4%AF-%E0%A4%B8%E0%A4%82%E0%A4%AE%E0%A5%87%E0%A4%B2%E0%A4%A8%E0%A4%BE%E0%A4%9A%E0%A5%8D%E0%A4%AF%E0%A4%BE-%E0%A4%85%E0%A4%A7%E0%A5%8D%E0%A4%AF%E0%A4%95%E0%A5%8D%E0%A4%B7%E0%A4%AA%E0%A4%A6%E0%A4%BE%E0%A4%B8%E0%A4%BE%E0%A4%A0%E0%A5%80-%E0%A4%9A%E0%A5%81%E0%A4%B0%E0%A4%B8-221110194.html
 Sakal – https://web.archive.org/web/20120102165830/http://esakal.com/esakal/20110930/5459704648668892194.htm
 Narayan Surve (Maharashtra Times) – http://maharashtratimes.indiatimes.com/articleshow/msid-5442116,prtpage-1.cms
 Kusumagraj Pratishthan – http://www.kusumagraj.org/kusumagraj/sahityasuchi.php
 Akhil Bharatiya Marathi Sahitya Sammelan (prahar) – http://www.prahaar.in/mobile/mumbai/33704.html
 Maharashtra Times – https://archive.today/20130126064833/http://maharashtratimes.indiatimes.com/articleshowarchive.cms?msid=1390612
 Goa Gazal sahitya Sammelan January 2012 – https://archive.today/20130129131223/http://www.navprabha.com/navprabha/node/2178
 Dr. Kale on Poet Grace (Sakal) – https://archive.today/20130122102031/http://www.esakal.com/esakal/20101023/5501351390382077501.htm

Living people
Marathi-language writers
1953 births
Writers from Nagpur
Academic staff of Rashtrasant Tukadoji Maharaj Nagpur University
Presidents of the Akhil Bharatiya Marathi Sahitya Sammelan